Tiera Skovbye (born May 6, 1995) is a Canadian actress. She began her career as a child actress. She is known for starring in television films such as her role playing Elizabeth Berkley in Lifetime's The Unauthorized Saved by the Bell Story; for her recurring roles as Polly Cooper on The CW series Riverdale, as Robin on the ABC television series Once Upon a Time. Skovbye starred as Grace Knight on the Global series Nurses.

Career
Skovbye's first substantial role was as the 10-year old Jane on the drama series Painkiller Jane in 2007. Skovbye has also appeared in a number of television films, most notably Lifetime's The Unauthorized Saved by the Bell Story in which she played Elizabeth Berkley. 

In early 2017, she began playing the recurring role of Polly Cooper on The CW teen drama series Riverdale. Skovbye played the recurring role of Robin, the daughter of Zelena and Robin Hood, during the seventh season of Once Upon a Time. In 2018, she appeared in the horror mystery film Summer of 84, opposite Graham Verchere, Judah Lewis, and Rich Sommer. 

Skovbye starred as Grace Knight on the Global drama series Nurses, which ran from 2020 to 2021.

Personal life
Skovbye was born in Vancouver, British Columbia. She has a younger sister, Ali, who is also an actress, and who co-stars on the Netflix series Firefly Lane.

On August 14, 2017, Skovbye announced her engagement to Jameson Parker.

Filmography

Film

Television

Music videos
 "Vessel" (2019) by Royal

References

External links
 

1995 births
21st-century Canadian actresses
Living people
Actresses from Vancouver
Canadian television actresses
Canadian film actresses